An event film or event movie is a blockbuster film whose release itself is considered a major event.

Criteria
It could be a highly anticipated sequel or a big budget film with state-of-the-art special effects or major stars generating considerable attention. Although it is subjective what is and what isn't considered an event movie, they are usually among the highest-grossing movies in their years of release and become a part of popular culture.

Examples
Steven Spielberg's Jaws from 1975 is the first film that was considered an event movie at the time of its release, but some sources also retroactively apply the term to earlier films such as The Birth of a Nation (1915), Gone with the Wind (1939), and Ben-Hur (1959). Examples more recent than Jaws include Spielberg's Jurassic Park (1993), James Cameron's Titanic (1997), Spider-Man (2002) and Avatar (2009) alongside the Star Wars (1977-present), Harry Potter (2001-2010), and Lord of the Rings (2001-2003) films. In the 2010s, other event movies include The Hunger Games (2012), Frozen (2013), Deadpool (2016), Batman v. Superman: Dawn of Justice (2016) and many films from the Marvel Cinematic Universe in particular Avengers: Infinity War (2018) and Avengers: Endgame (2019).

See also
Event television
Four-quadrant movie
List of highest-grossing films
Media franchise
National Film Registry
Tent-pole (entertainment)

References

Further reading

Film and video terminology
1970s in film
1990s in film
2000s in film
2010s in film